This is a list of topics related to the British Empire.

Communications
All Red Line

Geography
Territorial evolution of the British Empire
"The empire on which the sun never sets"

Government
British Raj (1858–1947) sometimes unofficially known as the "Indian Empire"
Colonial Office
Company rule in India (1757–1858)
Foreign and Commonwealth Office
Monarchy of the United Kingdom
Viceroy

Historians
 Historiography of the British Empire
 Pageant of Empire
 The Cambridge History of the British Empire
 The Oxford History of the British Empire

Wars and conflicts
Battle of Trafalgar
American Revolution
Imperial fortress
The Troubles
Easter Rising

Commonwealth
Commonwealth of Nations

List of British Empire-related topics
Topics
British Empire
British Empire
Commonwealth of Nations